The climate of Moncton is mostly maritime, typical of most cities located in the Maritime Provinces of Canada, but the climate demonstrates strong seasonal continental influences. Despite being less than 50 km (31 mi) from the Bay of Fundy and less than 30 km (19 mi) from the Northumberland Strait, the climate can seem more continental than maritime during the summer and winter seasons, whereas maritime influences tend to temper the transitional seasons of spring and autumn.

Seasons

Winter

Winter days are cold but generally sunny with solar radiation generating some warmth. Daytime high temperatures usually range just below the freezing point. Several cold snaps usually occur each winter when temperatures can fall to between -15 °C (5 °F) and -25 °C (-13 °F). Similarly, there are usually one or two "January thaws" each year when considerable snow melt can occur. Major snowfalls can result from nor'easter ocean storms moving up the east coast of North America, following the jet stream from the southeastern United States. Large amounts of precipitation can result from the counterclockwise rotation of these storms picking up moisture from the Atlantic Ocean and dumping it on southeastern New Brunswick as the storms pass by to the south and east of the region. This can be amplified locally by "sea effect" snow squall activity due to northeasterly winds passing over the nearby Gulf of St. Lawrence on the trailing edge of the storm. In February 1992, a nor'Easter lasted for two days and dropped 162 cm (65 inches) of snow on the Moncton area. That record was not beaten until Winter of 2015. Major snowfalls more typically average 20–30 cm (8–12 in) and are frequently mixed with rain or freezing rain.

Spring

Spring is frequently delayed because the sea ice that forms in the nearby Gulf of St. Lawrence during the previous winter requires time to melt and this cools the prevailing onshore winds. The ice burden in the gulf however has diminished considerably over the course of the last decade, which may be a consequence of global warming. The springtime cooling effect has subsequently weakened. Daytime temperatures above freezing are typical by mid March. Trees are usually in full leaf by the end of May.

Summer

Summers are warm, with occasional hot days, and often humid due to the seasonal prevailing westerly winds strengthening the continental tendencies of the local climate. Daytime highs average around 25 °C (77 °F) but exceed 30 °C (86 °F) on occasion. Rainfall is generally modest, especially in late July and August and periods of drought are not uncommon.

Autumn

Autumn is influenced by the retention of heat in the nearby Gulf of St. Lawrence and daytime temperatures remain mild until mid October. First snowfalls usually do not occur until mid November and consistent snow cover on the ground does not happen until mid to late December. The Fundy coast of New Brunswick occasionally experiences the effects of post-tropical storms.

The stormiest weather of the year, with the greatest precipitation and the strongest winds, usually occur during the fall/winter transition (mid December to mid January).

Statistics

References 

Moncton
Climate by city in Canada